Tuulikki Pyykkönen (born 25 November 1963 in Puolanka, Kainuu) is a Finnish former cross-country skier who competed from 1987 to 1998. She won a bronze medal at the 4 × 5 km relay in the 1997 FIS Nordic World Ski Championships and had her best finish of sixth in the 15 km event at the 1989 FIS Nordic World Ski Championships.

Pyykkönen's best individual finish at the Winter Olympics was 12th in the 5 km at Calgary in 1988. Her only individual victory was in a 5 km event in Finland in 1995.

Cross-country skiing results
All results are sourced from the International Ski Federation (FIS).

Olympic Games

World Championships
 1 medal – (1 bronze)

World Cup

Season standings

Individual podiums
 1 podium

Team podiums

 8 podiums 

Note:   Until the 1999 World Championships, World Championship races were included in the World Cup scoring system.

References

External links
 
 
 

1963 births
Living people
People from Puolanka
Finnish female cross-country skiers
Cross-country skiers at the 1988 Winter Olympics
Cross-country skiers at the 1992 Winter Olympics
Cross-country skiers at the 1994 Winter Olympics
Cross-country skiers at the 1998 Winter Olympics
FIS Nordic World Ski Championships medalists in cross-country skiing
Olympic cross-country skiers of Finland
Sportspeople from Kainuu
20th-century Finnish women